Margizoides is a genus of moths of the family Erebidae erected by Robert W. Poole in 1989.

Species
Margizoides terranea (Schaus, 1916) Guiana
Margizoides partitalis (Dyar, 1918) Mexico

References

Herminiinae